Saadey CM Saab is an Indian Punjabi comedy thriller released worldwide on 27 May 2016. Directed by Vipin Parashar, written by Sumeet Singh Manchanda, the film stars Harbhajan Mann, Kashish Singh, and Gurpreet Ghuggi.
 The official first look teaser of the movie is released on 15 March 2016 on SagaHits YouTube Channel.

Production
Saadey CM Saab, produced by Saga Music in association with Unisys Infosolutions, was shot in 60 different location around North India.

Plot
The film centers on three friends who dislike politics, and the problems when one (Harbhajan Mann) becomes chief minister.

Cast
 Harbhajan Mann
 Kashish Singh
 Gurpreet Ghuggi
 Rahul Singh
 Dev Gill (credited as Dev Singh Gill)
 Inder Bajwa

References

'Saadey CM Saab’ first look on koimoi.com
'Saadey CM Saab’ first look on womensera.com

External links
Like Saadey CM Saab page on Facebook
Watch Saadey CM Saab on YouTube/Sagahits
Saadey CM Saab event
Follow Saadey CM Saab on Twitter
Watch Saadey CM Saab all exclusive videos
Watch Sumeet Singh Manchanda's interview for Saadey CM Saab

2016 films
Punjabi-language Indian films
2010s Punjabi-language films